Eric Bisser (born 10 December 1985 in Cameroon) is a Cameroonian former footballer who is last known to have taken up a contract with Mbabane Swallows of the Swazi Premier League from 2010 to 2011.

Career

South Africa
Performed well in his debut for Ajax Cape Town in a draw with Maritzburg United, breaking up attacks in midfield and placing well-timed tackles.

Had a salary dispute with Ajax Cape Town after they let him go in September 2009, with the club paying him a large amount.

Swaziland
Recruited by Mbabane Swallows of the Swazi Premier League in 2010, Bisser was arrested for staying in the country illegally following his deregistration from the Swallows roster in 2011. He ended up not being immured in prison and instead paid a fine of 500 Swazi lilangenis.

References

External links 
at Footballdatabase.eu

Association football midfielders
Mbabane Swallows players
Expatriate soccer players in South Africa
Expatriate footballers in Eswatini
Cameroonian expatriate footballers
Living people
1985 births
Cape Town Spurs F.C. players
Cameroonian footballers
Cameroonian expatriate sportspeople in South Africa